Bagh Pir (also Romanized as Bāgh Pīr, Bāgh-e Pīr, and Bāgh-i-Pīr; also known as Morādī) is a village in Kabgan Rural District, Kaki District, Dashti County, Bushehr Province, Iran. At the 2006 census, its population was 160, in 33 families.

References 

Populated places in Dashti County